Willard Beach is a beach and neighborhood in South Portland, Maine. The beach, which covers 4 acres, used for swimming as well as commercial and recreational boating. Southern Maine Community College abuts the beach. Willard Beach is known for its views of Spring Point Ledge Light as well as island forts including Fort Gorges.

WillardFest is an annual one day neighborhood festival which began in 2012.

References

Beaches of Maine
Landforms of Cumberland County, Maine
Neighborhoods in Maine
Geography of South Portland, Maine